Nedyalko Stoyanov (born 26 January 1955) is a Bulgarian former cyclist. He competed in the individual road race and team time trial events at the 1976 Summer Olympics.

References

External links
 

1955 births
Living people
Bulgarian male cyclists
Olympic cyclists of Bulgaria
Cyclists at the 1976 Summer Olympics
Place of birth missing (living people)